RandM Records is a rock record label based in the UK

RandM Entertainment was started in 1998, by music industry executives Roy Eldridge and Mike Andrews, who together have a combined 50 years of experience in the industry. This was whilst with Papillon which was then part of Chrysalis Group. In 2002 this was spun off and RandM Records set up.

Artists
Ian Anderson
Martin Barre
Jethro Tull
Andy Summers
Bill Wyman
Gordon Haskell
Barbara Dickson
Space

See also
 List of record labels

External links
 Official site

Record labels established in 1998
Rock record labels
British independent record labels